Ben Daniel Crenshaw (born January 11, 1952) is a retired American professional golfer who has won 19 events on the PGA Tour, including two major championships: the Masters Tournament in 1984 and 1995. He is nicknamed Gentle Ben.

Professional career

Born in Austin, Texas, Crenshaw attended and played golf at Austin High School and the University of Texas, where he won three NCAA Championships from 1971 to 1973. Crenshaw was also a member of the Kappa Alpha Order fraternity; he turned professional in 1973.

In 1973, Crenshaw became the second player to win the first event after earning his tour card, achieved earlier by Marty Fleckman (1967). It was repeated by Jim Benepe (1988), Robert Gamez (1990), Garrett Willis (2001), and Russell Henley (2013). Together with his teammate George Burns, he won the 1979 Walt Disney World National Team Championship in Orlando in October 1979.

Following five runner-up finishes in major championships without a victory, including a sudden-death playoff for the 1979 PGA Championship, Crenshaw won the Masters Tournament in 1984. In the mid-1980s, he suffered from Graves' disease, a condition of the thyroid, but continued to accumulate victories; he finished with nineteen PGA Tour wins, including an emotional second Masters victory in 1995, which came a week after the death of his mentor Harvey Penick.

In 1999, Crenshaw was the captain of the United States Ryder Cup team for the matches at The Country Club in Brookline, Massachusetts, a Boston suburb. He was criticized from some quarters for his captaincy over the first two days as his team slipped to a 10–6 deficit; however, he was ultimately credited for providing the inspiration behind his side's remarkable turnaround in the Sunday singles, as the U.S. won 8 of the final day's twelve points to regain the Cup.

Crenshaw won several professional events outside the PGA Tour, including individual and team titles in the World Cup of Golf in 1988. He was among the top ten on McCormack's World Golf Rankings from 1976 to 1981 inclusive, and returned to spend 80 weeks in the top-10 of the Official World Golf Ranking from 1987 to 1989. In 1987, he became one of the few players in history to finish in the top ten of all four major championships in the same season without winning any of them.

Despite playing mainly in the United States, Crenshaw had a number of top performances in international events in his career. He won the 1976 Irish Open and then finished runner-up to compatriot Hubert Green the next year. He also finished runner-up at two events on the Australasian Tour, at the 1978 Australian Open and the 1982 Australian PGA Championship. And he famously had two runner-ups at The Open Championship, behind Jack Nicklaus in 1978 and Seve Ballesteros the following year.

Crenshaw is widely regarded as one of the best putters in golf history. His instructor growing up, Harvey Penick, taught him a smooth, effortless stroke on the greens, which allowed him to master even the speediest of greens–including those at Augusta National Golf Club. In winning the Masters in 1995, "Gentle Ben" did not record a single three-putt during the tournament.

Since 1986, Crenshaw has been a partner with Bill Coore in Coore & Crenshaw, a golf course design firm.

The Masters in 2015 was the 44th and final for Crenshaw.

Crenshaw has the worst playoff record in PGA Tour history at 0–8.

Personal life

Crenshaw married his second wife Julie in 1985. All three of his daughters – Claire Susan, Anna Riley and Katherine Vail – were presented to high society as debutantes at the International Debutante Ball at the Waldorf-Astoria Hotel in New York City.

Crenshaw is a Republican and has donated money to multiple Republican candidates.

Amateur wins
1968 International Jaycee Junior Golf Tournament
1971 NCAA Championship, Eastern Amateur, Southern Amateur
1972 NCAA Championship (tie with Tom Kite), Eastern Amateur, Porter Cup, Trans-Mississippi Amateur
1973 NCAA Championship, Western Amateur, Sunnehanna Amateur, Southern Amateur, Northeast Amateur

Professional wins (30)

PGA Tour wins (19)

*Note: Tournament shortened to 54 holes due to rain.

PGA Tour playoff record (0–8)

European Tour wins (3)

European Tour playoff record (0–1)

Other wins (9)
1975 Texas State Open
1979 Texas State Open
1980 Texas State Open
1981 Mexican Open
1985 Shootout at Jeremy Ranch (with Miller Barber)
1988 World Cup (team title with Mark McCumber), World Cup Individual Trophy
1991 Fred Meyer Challenge (with Paul Azinger)
1995 PGA Grand Slam of Golf

Senior wins (1)
2009 Wendy's Champions Skins Game (with Fuzzy Zoeller)

Major championships

Wins (2)

Results timeline

LA = Low amateur
CUT = missed the halfway cut
WD = withdrew
"T" indicates a tie for a place.

Summary

Most consecutive cuts made – 13 (twice)
Longest streak of top-10s – 6 (1975 U.S. Open – 1977 Masters)

Results in The Players Championship

CUT = missed the halfway cut
"T" indicates a tie for a place

Notable
He played on four Ryder Cup teams (1981, 1983, 1987, 1995) and captained the 1999 team.
In 1987, he became one of the few players in history to record top-10 finishes in all four major championships in the same season. Ed Dudley, Arnold Palmer, Gary Player, Doug Sanders, Miller Barber, Jack Nicklaus, Hale Irwin, Tom Watson, Tiger Woods, Sergio García, Ernie Els, Phil Mickelson, Vijay Singh, Rickie Fowler, Jordan Spieth, Brooks Koepka, Jon Rahm, and Rory McIlroy have also achieved the feat.
In 1991, Crenshaw was given the Bob Jones Award, the highest honor bestowed by the United States Golf Association in recognition of distinguished sportsmanship in golf.
His stepmother, Roberta Crenshaw, was an Austin-area philanthropist.
He is now a noted golf course designer, working in partnership with Bill Coore.
He was inducted into the World Golf Hall of Fame in 2002.
He is the 2006 Kappa Alpha Order Sportsman of the Year.
"If we are to preserve the integrity of golf as left to us by our forefathers, it is up to all of us to carry on the true spirit of the game."

U.S. national team appearances
Amateur
Eisenhower Trophy: 1972 (winners)

Professional
Ryder Cup: 1981 (winners), 1983 (winners), 1987, 1995, 1999 (winners, non-playing captain)
World Cup: 1987, 1988 (winners, individual winner)
Kirin Cup: 1988 (winners)
Dunhill Cup: 1995
Wendy's 3-Tour Challenge (representing Senior PGA Tour): 2002

See also
1973 PGA Tour Qualifying School graduates
List of golfers with most PGA Tour wins

References

External links

American male golfers
Texas Longhorns men's golfers
PGA Tour golfers
PGA Tour Champions golfers
Ryder Cup competitors for the United States
Winners of men's major golf championships
World Golf Hall of Fame inductees
Golf course architects
Golfers from Austin, Texas
Austin High School (Austin, Texas) alumni
1952 births
Living people